Basil Lam (1914 - 4 March 1984) was an English early music scholar and harpsichordist. A producer for the Third Programme of the BBC since its inception in September 1946, Lam eventually became head of the classical musical division of the BBC in the 1960s. He was best known for his contributions as a commentator on early and baroque music on BBC Radio 3, particularly the series "Plainsong and the rise of European music" (1978-1979). He also played in several musical ensembles. Lam published many articles and books, specializing on Bach, Handel and Beethoven, and edited various musical scores, including editions of Handel's Messiah and the lute music of Dowland.

Selected publications
 Beethoven String Quartets, BBC Music Guides, Vols 32–33, 1975.
The collected lute music of John Dowland with Lute tablature and keyboard notation (with Diana Poulton), 1974, 1978 and 1981, Faber.
 Handel: A symposium (1954) Oxford University Press, chapters on church and orchestral music.
 Of German music: A symposium (1976), O. Wolff, chapter on the Classical Symphony.
 Authenticity and the St John Passion, Early Music, Vol. 5, 1977, pp. 45–49

References
Obituary, (1984), The Musical Times, vol. 125, page 278.

External links
Basil Lam archive, Royal College of Music
 March That Goes Out With a Lam, Los Angeles Times
Review of Lam's performing edition of Handel's Messiah, Gramophone
Quadrille with a Raven, memoirs by Humphrey Searle

1914 births
1984 deaths
English musicologists
BBC Radio 3 presenters
20th-century British musicologists
BBC radio producers
BBC music executives